Siavan may refer to:
 Siavan, Oshnavieh
 Siavan, Salmas